The 2009–10 Czech 2. Liga was the 17th season of the 2. česká fotbalová liga, the second tier of the Czech football league. The season began on 31 August 2009 and ended on 5 June 2010. There was a winter break between 17 November 2009 and 4 March 2010.

Team changes

From 2. Liga
Promoted to Czech First League
 Bohemians 1905
 1. FC Slovácko

Relegated to Moravian-Silesian Football League
 HFK Olomouc
 Fotbal Fulnek

To 2. Liga
Relegated from Czech First League
 FC Tescoma Zlín
 FK Viktoria Žižkov

Promoted from Bohemian Football League
 Vlašim

Promoted from Moravian-Silesian Football League
 FC Hlučín

League table

Top goalscorers

See also
 2009–10 Czech First League
 2009–10 Czech Cup

References

Official website 
Česko - Druhá liga 2009/2010 - tabulky 

Czech 2. Liga seasons
Czech
2009–10 in Czech football